"Kun for mig" is a song by Danish singer Medina. The song is written by Medina, Jeppe Federspiel and Rasmus Stabell. It was released in 2008 in Denmark by Medina. The song peaked at #1 of the Danish Singles Chart for 7 weeks in 3 runs and stayed a total of 63 weeks in the Danish charts. Produced by hip hop producers Providers, "Kun for mig" became the best selling single of 2009 in Denmark.

"Kun for dig" (meaning "Just for you" in Danish) a duet version of "Kun for mig" released by Medina with rapper L.O.C. (Liam O'Connor) also reached #1 in the Danish Singles chart for a week in July 2009.

Track list
Single
 "Kun for mig" – 4:12
Remix EP
 "Kun for mig" (DJ Aligator Club Remix) – 5:56
 "Kun for mig" (DJ Aligator Radio Remix) – 3:59
 "Kun for mig" (Rune RK Remix) – 6:00
 "Kun for mig" (Spider Monkey Remix) – 7:59
 "Kun for mig" (Svendstrup & Vendelboe Remix) – 5:04

Versions

Kun for dig (Medina feat. L.O.C.)

"Kun for dig" (meaning "Just for you" in Danish) was a version of "Kun for mig" (meaning "Just for me" in Danish) released by Medina with rapper L.O.C. (Liam O'Connor).

Medina feat. Burhan G version

Another version was released in 2009 by Medina featuring Burhan G. It did not chart in the Danish Singles Chart.

English version

"You and I", an English language was released internationally with lyrics translated into English by Adam Powers and Julie Steincke. It was released in the UK on 21 September 2009 by Parlophone. "You and I" debuted at #80 on the UK Singles Chart on 10 October 2009 and peaked at #39 two weeks later. In 2010 it peaked at #3 in Bulgaria and at #10 in Germany.

Charts
Kun for mig

Kun for dig

References

Kun for mig
Kun for dig

2008 songs
2008 singles
Danish-language songs
Songs written by Rasmus Stabell
Songs written by Jeppe Federspiel
Number-one singles in Denmark
Songs written by Medina (singer)
Medina (singer) songs